The New Car Assessment Program for Southeast Asia, or known as ASEAN NCAP, is an automobile safety rating program jointly established by the Malaysian Institute of Road Safety Research (MIROS) and Global New Car Assessment Program (Global NCAP) upon a collaborative MoU signed by both parties during the FIA (Fédération Internationale de l'Automobile) Foundation Annual General Assembly in New Delhi, India on 7 December 2011.

In January 2013, ASEAN NCAP has published the program's first phase results involving seven popular models in the ASEAN region’s market. At this stage, two separate assessments conducted in the rating scheme which are the Adult Occupant Protection (AOP) by star-rating and Child Occupant Protection (COP) by percentage-based rating.

Member organizations 

Currently, the following organizations are officially in the ASEAN NCAP member organizations:

 Malaysian Institute of Road Safety Research (MIROS)
Global New Car Assessment Program (GNCAP)
 Automobile Association of Malaysia (AAM)
 Automobile Association of the Philippines (AAP)
 Automobile Association of Singapore (AA Singapore)

Financial support organizations
 Global New Car Assessment Program (GNCAP)
 Malaysian Institute of Road Safety Research (MIROS)

Testing 
Due to the high number of deaths on motorcycles in the region, ASEAN NCAP began prioritizing biker safety from 2017.

See also 
 Milo tin

References

External links 
 ASEAN NCAP Official website
 Overview of ASEAN NCAP Tests

New Car Assessment Programs
Consumer organisations in Malaysia
Organizations established in 2011
2011 establishments in India